Gilberto Obdulio Porcal Martinez is an Anglican bishop in Uruguay. He has been the Suffragan Bishop of Uruguay since 2012.

References

21st-century Anglican bishops in South America
Living people
Anglican bishops of Uruguay
Year of birth missing (living people)